Dabas is an exogamous, patrilineal Jat gotra (clan) of India. Among their locales are the Haryana state and Delhi.

Notable people bearing the last name include
Parvin Dabas, Indian film actor

References

Jat clans of Haryana
Jat clans of Delhi